Ranscombe Farm, in Cuxton in North Kent, is a Plantlife Nature Reserve and working farm. Part of the site is included in the Cobham Woods Site of Special Scientific Interest, and the whole farm is within the Kent Downs Area of Outstanding Natural Beauty.

Ranscombe Farm Reserve works in partnership with five other sites in the local area. They are Shorne Wood Country Park, Jeskyns, Cobham Park, Ashenbank Wood and the Cobham Leisure Plots.

It has been a source for flower collectors for centuries. Nationally rare species, Hairy Mallow and Meadow Clary, were both collected from Ranscombe Farm, in 1699 and 1792 respectively. Other rarities include Ground Pine and Broad-leaved Cudweed and at least six species of orchid including Fly, Lady ('Fair Maidens of Kent') and Man Orchid.

The chalk grassland hosts a rich suite of plants including Wild Liquorice and Horseshoe Vetch.

The arable flora includes Corncockle, Blue Pimpernel, Night-flowering Catchfly, Narrow-fruited Cornsalad (Valerianella dentata)  and Dense-flowered Fumitory.

What to see and when

April: Bluebell, Early purple orchid 
May: Lady Orchid, Fly Orchid, Man Orchid
June: Meadow Clary, Hairy Mallow, Ground Pine, common milkwort
July: Corncockle, Clustered Bellflower, Four species of poppy (Common, Rough, Prickly and Long-headed)

Location
TQ 718 675  
Railway Station: Cuxton
By Bus. Nu-Venture 151 to Cuxton.
By Bus. Arriva, 140 to Strood - Marlowe Park [Wells Rd] then Elgin Gardens then the underpass located behind Elgin Gardens.
By Bus. Arriva, 141 to Strood - Earl Estate then Albatross Avenue then the underpass located at the car park.
By Road. M2 to Junction 2, Carpark entrance on A228 200m on the right after exit roundabout.

Ranscombe Farm straddles the North Downs Way, long-distance footpath.

References

External links

 Plantlife Nature Reserves, Ranscombe Farm.

Sites of Special Scientific Interest in Kent
Nature reserves in Kent
Medway